The 110th Street station was a station located on the Metro-North Railroad's Park Avenue Viaduct in East Harlem, Manhattan, New York City. The station was built by the New York Central & Hudson River Railroad as part of an agreement with the New York City government. It was located at Park Avenue and 110th Street.

History 

This station opened on May 15, 1876 with the introduction of partial rapid transit on the Harlem Line, with sixteen trains a day running between Grand Central Depot and William's Bridge. On the same date, the 86th Street station opened, and while that station was exclusively served by the rapid transit service, some trains expresses to Golden's Bridge stopped here. By 1904, this station was only served by local trains.

This station was rebuilt in 1896-1897 as the line's grade was raised onto iron girders. The viaduct and new station opened in February 1897.

On April 24, 1906, the New York Central applied to the New York State Board of Railroad Commissioners for permission to discontinue service at the 110th Street station. The Board granted the Central permission on May 9 to close the station on June 1. However, it closed on June 17. This station and the 86th Street station were the only two stations between 125th Street and Grand Central to receive regular passenger service.

Station layout 
The 110th Street station was partially built within the viaduct. The station's waiting room was built into the northern side of the bridge over the 110th Street and was located at street level. From the waiting room, two staircases went up along the side of the viaduct's retaining walls–one per side–to the side platforms atop the viaduct. The stairways to the street still exist, and are used in case of emergencies.

References

Former railway stations in New York (state)
Former New York Central Railroad stations
Railway stations in Manhattan
Railway stations closed in 1906
East Harlem
Park Avenue